Rook is the name of a British rocket. Twenty five Rook rockets were launched between 1959 and 1972. The launches took place from Aberporth in Wales and from Woomera in South Australia. The Rook has a maximum flight altitude of 20 kilometres, a launch mass of 1.2 tons and a length of 5 metres.

External links
https://web.archive.org/web/20080709063130/http://www.astronautix.com/lvs/rook.htm

Rockets and missiles